Andrew Phillip Rees Williams (born 8 October 1977) is a former professional footballer who played as a winger.

Football career
Williams began his playing career as a trainee at Southampton. During his time at Southampton he played just 21 league games, which included coming on as a substitute as Southampton won 3–2 against Liverpool at Anfield in February 1998. After a brief loan spell at Swindon Town in 1999, the Wiltshire club signed him on a permanent basis and he went on to make a total of 47 appearances in all competitions in his twenty months at the club, scoring one goal against Wolverhampton Wanderers. In 2001, he gave up playing full-time football due to injury. He joined Bath City, and began a career with the police. He spent three years in Bath before being forced to entirely retire from football due to a knee injury in 2004.

Williams won two full caps for Wales, against Brazil in 1997 and Malta in 1998.

Personal life 
He was brought up in Bishop Sutton, attending the local secondary school Chew Valley School. Andy now works at Future Publishing in Bath where he recently received an award for his 'Outstanding Contribution' over the year. He lives near Bristol.

References

External links

1977 births
Living people
Footballers from Bristol
People from Trowbridge
Welsh footballers
Wales international footballers
Association football defenders
Southampton F.C. players
Swindon Town F.C. players
Bath City F.C. players
Wales under-21 international footballers
Premier League players
English Football League players
People educated at Chew Valley School